Frontier Economics (Frontier) is a microeconomics consultancy providing economics advice to public and private sector clients on matters of competition policy, public policy, regulation, commercial strategy, behavioural economics and energy and climate change. The Frontier Economics network consists of separate companies based in Europe (Berlin, Brussels, Cologne, Dublin, London, Madrid and Paris) and Australia (Melbourne, Sydney and Brisbane) & Singapore.

Main competitors are CRA, Compass Lexecon, Cornerstone Research, FTI Consulting, NERA, Oxera and RBB Economics.

Frontier Economics Ltd was ranked number 5 in Vault’s ‘2022 Best Consulting Firms in EMEA for Economic Consulting’ category, in the top 10 for environmental sustainability consulting and top 15 for energy consulting.

History
Frontier Economics Ltd  was formed in June 1999 as an employee-owned company with around 25 consultants. The first board of directors consisted of Simon Gaysford, Zoltan Biro, Philip Burns, Dan Elliott and Michael Webb, with Sarah Hogg as the chairman of the board. George Adams and Julia Chain were also non-executive directors. Lord Gus O’Donnell, former Cabinet Secretary, joined Frontier as a senior advisor in 2012.[1] He took over from Sarah Hogg as chairman of Frontier in 2013.[2] In 2016, George Adams stepped down as a non-executive director, and later in 2017 Javier Marin Romano was appointed as a non-executive director. In June 2020, two new Non-executive directors were appointed, Marieke Bax and David Aitman, replacing Julia Chan. The company currently employs over 400 staff across its European offices. In 2003, Frontier created a German office in Cologne, followed by the opening of the office in Brussels in 2006–2007 and Madrid in 2008. The Dublin office was established in 2011, followed by a presence in Paris in 2013 (later becoming an office in 2017) and Berlin in 2017.

Frontier Economics Pty Ltd was formed in Australia in May 1999 by Danny Price (managing director), Philip Williams and David Briggs. In 2016, the company opened an office in Singapore. The company currently employs around 30 consultants across offices in Australia and Singapore. In April 2015, Stephen Gray became chairman of Frontier Economics Pty Ltd. Current directors include Danny Price, Stephen Gray and Andrew Harpham.

References

Macroeconomics consulting firms